Christian Brothers’ College Kimberley (“CBC”), the first Christian Brothers’ College (School) in South Africa, was founded by the Christian Brothers  from Ireland, UK on 8 September 1897. It is situated in Kimberley, Northern Cape, South Africa. The founder was E.I.Rice. It is a Catholic High School.

Beginnings
JJ Mulan was the first Head Master. In 1905, the school opened boarding facilities. These hostels were designed by Rogers and Ross. It was built by Church and MacLauchlin.

School crest
The crest consists of a star, a cross, a circle and a book, that is open. It also shows the symbols A and Ω, Alpha and Omega
The meaning is:
Star an indication of guidance.
The circle shows eternity.
Christ is pertained in the cross.
The open book shows learning from an early age.
The A and Ω is from  "I am Alpha and Omega, the beginning and the ending, saith the Lord, which is, and which was, and which is to come, the Almighty".

School motto
Two mottos  are used  collectively:
 and

Temporarily closed
CBC was temporarily closed from 16 February 1900 to 7 May 1900. During World War I it was used as a military hospital.  Teaching went ahead in tents erected on the schools premises. In 1933 a clock tower as erected as a memory to the soldiers that died in the war.

Chapel
On the school’s ground, a chapel was built which opened in 1923. It was designed by an Irish architect o’Connor, G.L.

Today
It is a co-ed school, with English as medium of education. It is an Independent School, regulated by the Independent Schools Association of Southern Africa (ISASA).

1997
In 1997, the school on its 100th year celebration decided to change its name to St Patrick CBC.

Other CBC schools in South Africa
Veritas College – Springs, Gauteng 
Christian Brothers' College, St John's Parklands – Cape Town, Western Cape 
Christian Brothers' College, St Joseph's – Bloemfontein, Free State 
St Dominic's College – Welkom, Free State

Alumni
Clive Derby-Lewis - A Conservative Party (South Africa) a politician who was a collaborator with Janusz Walus in the assassination of Chris Hani
Tommy Bedford - Springbok rugby captain and apartheid critic.
Donald Woods - Journalist and anti-apartheid  activist.
Frank Templeton Prince -  British Poet 
John Briscoe – An engineer (water) and received the Stockholm Water Prize.
Patrick (Pat) Joseph Lyster – Springbok Rugby Wing, playing for the Springboks between 1933 and 1937.
Graham Etherington –Journalist and editor of Diamond Fields Advertiser
Reunert Sidney Bauser - Rugby administrator, Freemason Grand Master and Mayor of Kimberley.
John Steele Chalsty  -Investment banker and  Chairman of the United Nations Association of the USA

References

Schools in the Northern Cape
High schools in South Africa